Coconut Records is a German record label formed in 1981 by producers Tony Hendrik and Karin Hartmann. The label has released multiple genres of music, including dance, schlager, eurodance, electronica, Hi-NRG, Dance-pop and R&B.

Artists
Artists currently signed to Coconut Records include Londonbeat, Andreas Martin, Wolfgang Petry, Haddaway, Bad Boys Blue, Soultans, Chyp-Notic and A La Carte.

See also
 List of record labels
 Bad Boys Blue discography

References

External links
 Official site

German record labels
Record labels established in 1981
Pop record labels
Electronic dance music record labels
IFPI members